Pedro "Pecente" Vicente da Fonseca, commonly known as Picente Fonseca, or simply as Picente (born January 21, 1935, in São Vicente) is a retired Brazilian professional basketball player. At a height of 1.80 m (5'11") tall, he played at the point guard position.

Professional career
As a professional player, he played for several clubs, including: São Vicente, Santos, and XV de Piracicaba.

National team career
With the senior Brazilian national basketball team, Picente won the gold medal at the 1959 FIBA World Championship, in Chile. He also won bronze medals at the 1955 Pan American Games, and the 1959. He also won a bronze medal at the 1955 FIBA South American Championship. In total, he played in 26 official games with the senior Brazilian national team, scoring a total of 151 points.

Post-playing career
After he ended his basketball playing career, Picente became the technical coordinator of the Clube de Campo de Piracicaba youth basketball teams, as well as the director of AVEBESP, which is the veteran basketball players association of São Paulo state.

References

1935 births
Living people
Basketball players at the 1955 Pan American Games
Basketball players at the 1959 Pan American Games
Brazilian men's basketball players
1959 FIBA World Championship players
FIBA World Championship-winning players
Pan American Games bronze medalists for Brazil
Pan American Games medalists in basketball
People from São Vicente, São Paulo
Point guards
Medalists at the 1955 Pan American Games
Sportspeople from São Paulo (state)